Khaen Dong is a district (amphoe) in the northern part of Buriram province, northeastern Thailand.

Geography
Neighboring districts are (from the east clockwise) Satuek, Ban Dan and Khu Mueang of Buriram Province and Chumphon Buri of Surin province.

Motto
The Khaen Dong District's motto is "The city of iron wood and rubber, rocket festival, clear water, Kud Ta Lae Suan, Lamtakhong reservoir and Mun river Long island-Pak Tad Beach so beautiful, ancient city."

History
The minor district (king amphoe) was established on 1 July 1997, when it was split off from Satuek district.

On 15 May 2007, all 81 minor districts in Thailand were upgraded to full districts. With publication in the Royal Gazette on August 24 the upgrade became official.

Administration
The district is divided into four sub-districts (tambons), which are further subdivided into 61 villages (mubans). Khaen Dong is a township (thesaban tambon) which covers parts of tambon Khaen Dong. There are also four tambon administrative organizations (TAO).

References

External links
amphoe.com
 

Khaen Dong